The 13th constituency of the Rhône (French: Treizième circonscription du Rhône) is a French legislative constituency in the Rhône département. Like the other 576 French constituencies, it elects one MP using a two round electoral system.

Description

The 13th constituency of the Rhône lies to the east of Lyon and is largely suburban in character. The largest town in the constituency, Meyzieu, lies close to Lyon's main airport.

The constituency has elected by centre right and centre left representatives in recent years. At the 2017 election the PS vote collapsed to the extent that they came 6th in the first round with under 5% of the vote.

Assembly Members

Election results

2022

 
 
|-
| colspan="8" bgcolor="#E9E9E9"|
|-

2017

 
 
 
 
 
 
 
|-
| colspan="8" bgcolor="#E9E9E9"|
|-

2012

 
 
 
 
 
|-
| colspan="8" bgcolor="#E9E9E9"|
|-

2007

 
 
 
 
 
 
|-
| colspan="8" bgcolor="#E9E9E9"|
|-

2002

 
 
 
 
 
 
|-
| colspan="8" bgcolor="#E9E9E9"|
|-

1997

 
 
 
 
 
 
|-
| colspan="8" bgcolor="#E9E9E9"|
|-

References

13